Taylor's College is an independent college in Malaysia, offering the Cambridge A Levels as well as the South Australian Certificate of Education. It is ranked among the top Cambridge A Level college in Southeast Asia.

Taylor's College was established in 1969 by George Archibald Taylor and George Leighton Taylor. Initially, Taylor's offered the Victorian High School Certificate (VHSC). It currently offers Cambridge A Levels, South Australian Certificate of Education International, Foundation, Diploma in Business, Certified Accounting Technician (CAT) and Association of Chartered Certified Accountants (ACCA) professional programmes. The college received “University College” status in 2006, and "University" status in 2010, which further divide into Taylor's University and Taylor's College.

History
In 1920, George Archibald Taylor set up a coaching college called ‘George Taylor and Staff’ in Melbourne, Australia. Upon realizing that many Malaysians enrolled in his college, he and his son, George Leighton Taylor, established Taylor's College in Malaysia in 1969. The first branch campus was set up in Jalan Pantai to enable Malaysian students to matriculate within the country. The institution celebrated its 50th anniversary on 3 March 2019.

1969 – 2000
The first Taylor's campus, located at a building in Jalan Pantai, Kuala Lumpur, offered the Victorian High School Certificate (VHSC) programme for a student population of 345. It also pioneered the South Australian Matriculation (SAM) programme in 1982 and the Canadian Pre-university Programme in Malaysia in 1983. In 1989, Taylor's moved to its Subang Jaya campus in SS15, although the official opening was on 2 November, 1992, officiated by the Menteri Besar of Selangor, Tan Sri Dato’ Haji Muhammad bin Haji Mohd Taib. Taylor’s College also pioneered the first twinning programme in Malaysia with an agreement signed with RMIT on 23 February, 1987. This set a precedent for other twinning programmes in Taylor’s, such as with the University of Sheffield in 1992 and the University of Technology, Sydney, in 1993. The Cambridge A-Level Programme was introduced in Taylor’s College in 1991.

By 1990, other programmes were introduced, including the American Degree Transfer Program; Architecture, Quantity Surveying & Construction; Business, Accounting, Marketing & Finance; Computer Science, Software Engineering & IT; Engineering; Hospitality, Tourism & Culinary Arts; and the Taylor's Business Foundation.

2000 – 2019 (Present)
In 2001, the fourth Taylor's College campus in Wisma Subang, housing the Taylor's Business School, was launched. The following year, Taylor's College Petaling Jaya (TCPJ) became the fifth Campus at Leisure Commerce Square and Taylor's School of Hospitality and Tourism was relocated from Kuala Lumpur to the new campus. TCPJ also housed the School of Communication, School of Architecture Building and Design, and Taylor's School of Computing. In 2004, the 6th Campus was launched in Subang Square housing the American Degree Transfer Program.

With the launch of the seventh and newest campus in Sri Hartamas (TCSH) in 2008, Taylor's College was able to offer the Cambridge A Level programme, South Australian Matriculation programme, and the International Baccalaureate Diploma Programme to an additional 800 students from across the Klang Valley.

In 2018, Taylor's College moved its base of operations from its Subang Jaya and Sri Hartamas campuses to the Taylor's Lakeside Campus, the same campus grounds as Taylor’s University.

Academic Programmes

Cambridge A Levels
The Cambridge A Level (CAL) programme at Taylor's is conducted by the Cambridge International Examinations (CIE ). It provides a foundation to various international tertiary programmes around the world.

Taylor's College Subang Jaya was the first to be awarded the International Fellowship Centre Status in Malaysia by University of Cambridge International Examinations in 2004.

An 18-month programme, it prepares students for examinations in two phases: Advanced Subsidiary (AS) level and Advanced Two (A2) level. With this 2-stage assessment, students are given more opportunities to phase their learning to gain in-depth knowledge and lifelong skills that prepare them for success in their higher education and future employment.

South Australian Certificate of Education International
The South Australian Certificate of Education (SACE) International programme, formerly known as the South Australian Matriculation (SAM) programme, is the most popular  Australian-based Pre-U programme in Malaysia. Many SACE International (SACEi) students apply to enter top universities around the world including Australia, Singapore, Hong Kong, India, New Zealand, the UK and the US.
 
The SACEi curriculum focuses on the development of key capabilities that are essential to a student's future education, training and careers, and his role as an active and informed member of the community. Students studying the SACE curriculum will gain valuable literacy, numeracy, critical thinking and problem-solving skills on top of the knowledge gained from their choice of subjects. The structure of assessment, which will take place between 1 and 1½ years, is 70% school-based assessment and 30% external examination.

Foundation and Diploma
As part of the Taylor's Education Group's Higher Education Group strategic positioning, Taylor's College will be focusing on pre-university studies, professional studies and franchise degree programmes as part of its focus from 2019 onwards.   

Effective 1 January 2019, eight foundation programmes (Arts, Science, Business, Computing, Communication, Design, Engineering and Natural & Built Environment) and the Diploma in Business, which were previously offered by Taylor's University, have been moved to Taylor's College.

Professional Programmes
Taylor's College offers two professional programmes starting from January 2019; the Certified Accounting Technician (CAT) and Association of Chartered Certified Accountants (ACCA) papers.

Taylor's Lakeside Campus
In 2018, Taylor's College moved its Subang Jaya and Sri Hartamas campuses and combined it with the Taylor's Lakeside campus, where the campus of Taylor's University resided. Set on 27-acres of tropical greenery, the integrated purpose-built campus surrounds a 5.5 acre man-made lake.

Achievements and recognition
Taylor's College provides students with British and Australian education, recognised by prestigious universities around the world through its Cambridge A Level (CAL) and South Australian Matriculation (SAM)/ SACE International programmes.

It was awarded the highest rating of 'Tier 6: Outstanding' rating by the Ministry of Higher Education Malaysia in the first three Malaysian Quality Evaluation System for Private Colleges (MyQUEST) rating exercises in 2011, 2013 and 2015.

Taylor's College was awarded Gold status in 2020 under the Approved Learning Partner programme by the Association of Chartered Certified Accountants.

Notable alumni

Politics
 Yang Berhormat Puan Hannah Yeoh - Deputy Minister of Woman, Family and Community Development
 YB Tuan Fahmi Fadzil – Member of Parliament, PKR

Business
 Yang Berbahagia Dato' Hj. Mahmud bin Dato' Dr. Hj. Abbas - Chief executive officer, Central Spectrum (M) Sdn Bhd
 Dr. Renard Siew - World Economic Forum Expert Network Member
 Joel Neoh – Founder of FAVE.MY, director of BookDoc, Founders of SAYS.com
 Vishen Lakhiani – Founder, Mindvalley, Dealmates & Blinklist
 Ignatius Ong – CEO, Firefly

Philanthropy / Social
 Deborah Priya Henry – Miss Universe Malaysia 2011, co-founder of Fugee School and Fugeelah

Media & Entertainment
 Sherson Lian - Chef and television host

References

External links 

Colleges in Malaysia
Universities and colleges in Selangor
Cambridge schools in Malaysia
Educational institutions established in 1969
1969 establishments in Malaysia